Piedmont Buggy Factory, also known as Bearskin Cotton Mills and Monroe Cotton Mills, is a historic building located at Monroe, Union County, North Carolina.  It was built in 1910, and is a three-story, rectangular brick building with a shallow pitched gable roof.  The brick is in six distinct shades of red. Also on the property are the contributing late-1910s one-story brick boiler house and a steel water tower (c. 1910).  Originally built as a buggy factory, in the late 1910s the factory was
converted to textile production and renamed the Bearskin Cotton Mills.  The facility remained in operation through 1956.

It was listed on the National Register of Historic Places in 2004.

References

Cotton mills in the United States
Industrial buildings and structures on the National Register of Historic Places in North Carolina
Industrial buildings completed in 1910
Buildings and structures in Union County, North Carolina
National Register of Historic Places in Union County, North Carolina
Wagons